David Forde may refer to:

David Forde (Clare hurler) (born 1976), Irish sportsperson
David Forde (footballer) (born 1979), professional Irish footballer
David Forde (Galway hurler) (born 1981), Irish sportsperson

See also
David Ford (disambiguation)